Béziers Cap d'Agde Airport  is an airport serving the town of Béziers and nearby Languedoc coastal resorts including Cap d'Agde. It is 11.5 km (6.2 NM) southeast of Béziers, near Vias in the Hérault department.

History
For some years there were plans to extend the runway and this work was finally carried out between November 2006 and February 2007. The new runway is now capable of handling the Boeing 737-sized jets favoured by low-cost carriers. Facilities are limited, with departure capacity just capable to accommodate passengers for two Boeing 737s, using the two gates.

After a runway expansion completed in 2007, daily direct flights to Paris Orly and seasonal services to Bastia were augmented by Ryanair flights to and from Bristol International Airport, which commenced March 2008. On 24 March 2008, it was announced that during the summer months Ryanair flights would also operate to and from London Stansted with a possibility of being extended should they prove successful. Further flights from Béziers to London Luton Airport were announced in June 2008 and these commenced twice a week from October 2008.

Facilities
It has one paved runway designated 09/27 with an asphalt surface measuring  The runway is equipped with ILS. Both local trains and TGV pass directly beside the terminal but do not stop.

Airlines and destinations
The following airlines operate regular scheduled and charter flights at Béziers Cap d'Agde Airport:

Statistics

References

 CCI Béziers: Direct, newsletter No. 7, Oct 2006, 
 La Ville de Béziers: Le journal de Béziers, No. 170, p9, November 2006

External links
 Official site, available in french and english
 
 

Airports in Occitania (administrative region)
Buildings and structures in Hérault
Airports established in 1938
Béziers